Lijia is a town in Chaotian District, Guangyuan, Sichuan province, China. , it administers Wangyuanshan Residential Community and the following eleven villages:
Yongle Village
Xinjian Village
Liushui Village
Qinglin Village
Weixing Village
Minzhu Village
Yixing Village
Shuiguan Village
Jiangjia Village
Wangjiaya Village
Xieyi Village

References

Township-level divisions of Sichuan
Guangyuan